"Glow" is a song by Canadian rapper Drake from his album, More Life. It features vocals from American rapper Kanye West. The song was sent to rhythmic crossover radio June 6, 2017, as the fifth official single from the album. The song “Glow” describes how far Kanye and Drake have come since starting out in the music industry, and how they are going to continue to shine in the spotlight for a long time. The duo boasts about fame and the luxury that comes along with it.

Commercial performance

North America
On April 8, 2017, "Glow" entered the charts at number 37 on the Billboard Canadian Hot 100. The song spent two weeks on the US Billboard Hot 100, entering the charts at number 54, its immediate peak, on April 8, 2017.

Internationally
The song has charted on the charts of Ireland, Sweden (Heatseeker) and the United Kingdom.

Charts

Release history

References

2017 songs
2017 singles
Cash Money Records singles
Drake (musician) songs
Kanye West songs
Songs written by Drake (musician)
Songs written by Kanye West
Songs written by Philip Bailey
Songs written by 40 (record producer)
Songs written by Maurice White
Songs written by Illangelo
Songs written by Ilsey Juber
Song recordings produced by 40 (record producer)
Song recordings produced by Kanye West
Songs written by Cyhi the Prynce